Alucita cymographa is a moth of the family Alucitidae. It was described by Edward Meyrick in 1929. It is found in New Guinea.

References

Moths described in 1929
Alucitidae
Moths of New Guinea
Taxa named by Edward Meyrick